Vache Vazgeni Gabrielyan (Armenian: Վաչե Վազգենի Գաբրիելյան; born November 24, 1968) is the Dean of the College of Business and Economics at the American University of Armenia. Previously, he served as the Deputy Prime Minister of Armenia and the Minister for International Economic Integration and Reforms from 2014-2018. Vache Gabrielyan started his career in public service in 1990 as a staff member in the Armenian Parliament. After completion of his studies in the United States, he held various positions in the Central Bank of Armenia, where from 2008 to 2010 he acted as the Vice-Governor. For the succeeding three years (2010-2013) he headed the Ministry of Finance of Armenia. As the Minister of Finance of Armenia, Gabrielyan initiated a number of reforms and contributed to fostering relationships with international institutions, particularly in his position as the country Governor for the International Monetary Fund.

After leaving the office of the Finance Minister, Vache Gabrielyan from 2013 to 2014 acted as the Chief of Staff of the Government of Armenia. Prior taking the Deputy Prime Minister Office in 2014, he served as the Chief Adviser to the Prime Minister of Armenia. Vache Gabrielyan since serves as the Armenian Governor for the World Bank, Asian Development Bank and European Bank for Reconstruction and Development.

Dr. Gabrielyan holds a Ph.D. in Public Administration from Rutgers University (New Jersey, USA) and honorary diploma from the Yerevan State University’s Economic Cybernetics Department (RA, 1985-1992).

Since 1999, Dr. Gabrielyan teaches at the American University of Armenia, and has lectured for more than a decade at the Yerevan State University. Dr. Gabrielyan is the author of а number of scientific papers, articles and books published in Armenia and abroad.

Vache Gabrielyan has extensive experience in finance, economics and public administration. He has played key roles in a vast array of reforms in the RA. His advanced academic background and continuous engagement with academic circles serves as a fertile soil for elaboration and implementation of value-adding strategies adopted by the Government of Armenia.

References

External links
 Deputy Prime Minister of Armenia - Vache Gabrielyan

Armenian bankers
Armenian economists
Central bankers
1968 births
Date of birth unknown
Living people
Rutgers University alumni
Members of the Council of the Eurasian Economic Commission
Finance ministers of Armenia
Government ministers of Armenia
Deputy Prime Ministers of Armenia